Sleepy Time or sleepytime may refer to:
 "Sleepy Time" (SpongeBob SquarePants)
 "Sleepy Time", an episode of GoGoRiki
 "Sleepytime", a second-series episode of the animated series Bluey
 Sleepytime, a brand of herbal tea blend from Celestial Seasonings
 Sleepytime, a Thoroughbred racehorse

See also
 Bedtime
 Siesta